Talbot Creek is a watercourse in Elgin County, Ontario, Canada, that drains into Lake Erie. It was first settled in 1803.

References 

Rivers of Ontario